Eirik Glambek Bøe (born 25 October 1975) is a Norwegian musician, writer and vocalist, best known for being part of the indie folk duo Kings of Convenience together with Erlend Øye. He has a degree in psychology from the University of Bergen. Although his native language is Norwegian, many of his writings are in English.

He formed the band Skog together with Øye in the 1990s. They formed Kings of Convenience in 1998 and released their first album Quiet Is The New Loud in 2001 (the same year Øye featured in Röyksopp's critically acclaimed debut album Melody A.M.). The duo then went on to release the single Toxic Girl followed by their second album Riot on an Empty Street in 2004.

In 2006 he featured in Øye's band The Whitest Boy Alive, and at a lesser degree Kommode, largely made up of the members of Skog.

In a rare guest appearance on NPR, Bøe sings on the track "How My Heart Behaves" on Feist's 2007 The Reminder.

In October 2009 Kings of Convenience released their third studio album Declaration of Dependence on Astralwerks.

References

External links
Kings of Convenience official website

1975 births
Living people
Norwegian musicians
21st-century Norwegian singers
21st-century guitarists